Dana Anderson Fabe (born March 29, 1951) is an American lawyer, retired judge, and mediator. She served as a justice of the Alaska Supreme Court from 1996 to 2016, including three terms (2000–2003, 2006–2009, and 2012–2015) as the court's chief justice. She previously served as an Alaska trial court judge for nearly eight years, from 1988 to 1996. Fabe was the first woman appointed to the Alaska Supreme Court, as well as its first female chief justice.

Early life and education
Fabe was born in Cincinnati, Ohio in 1951. She grew up in the Hyde Park neighborhood and attended the Seven Hills School. Fabe earned a Bachelor of Arts degree from Cornell University in 1973 and a Juris Doctor from the Northeastern University School of Law in 1976.

Career

After completing law school in 1976, Fabe moved to Alaska for a clerkship with Justice Edmond Burke on the Alaska Supreme Court. Following her one-year clerkship, in 1977 she accepted a position as a staff attorney for the Alaska Public Defender Agency, working first in appeals, then misdemeanor trials, then felony trials, and then as head of the appellate division. In 1981, she was appointed by Alaska Governor Jay Hammond as the chief public defender for Alaska, replacing Brian Shortell when he became a judge. She served in that position until 1988, when she became a judge herself.

In 1988, Governor Steve Cowper appointed Fabe to the Alaska Superior Court. She served as a judge on that trial court in Anchorage from 1988 to 1996, including serving as the deputy presiding Judge of the Third Judicial District from 1992 to 1995, and as a training judge for that district.

In March 1996, Governor Tony Knowles appointed Fabe to the Alaska Supreme Court, to fill the seat vacated by the retirement of Justice Daniel A. Moore Jr. Three times, her fellow justices elected her to three-year terms as the court's chief justice (2000–2003, 2006–2009, and 2012–2015). She was the first woman to serve as Justice and as chief justice, and the second individual to serve three terms as chief justice, after Jay Rabinowitz who served four.
  
Following the retirement of Justice David Souter from the Supreme Court of the United States in 2009, U.S. Senator Mark Begich recommended her as a possible successor in a letter to President Barack Obama.

One of her focus areas during her terms as chief justice was outreach to tribal courts. An Indian Law and Order Commission report in 2013 of its investigation into public safety and justice system in Alaska Native villages commended Fabe's efforts to adapt traditional Native practices in sentencing, calling them "innovative, impressive and welcome."

Fabe retired from the bench on June 1, 2016. Since then, she continued to serve the Alaska appellate courts as needed, as a pro tempore judge, and she has conducted a private mediation practice.

Professional organizations and honors

Fabe is a sustaining elected member of the American Law Institute, a Life Fellow of the American Bar Foundation, a former President of the National Association of Women Judges, and a former member of the board of directors and Second Vice-President of the Conference of Chief Justices.

She received the Sandra Day O’Connor Civic Outreach Award from the National Center for State Courts in 2017, the Distinguished Service Award from the same organization in 2012, and the Justice Vaino Spencer Leadership Award from the National Association of Women Judges in 2012. She was named as a member of the inaugural class of the Alaska Women's Hall of Fame in 2009, and as a Woman of Achievement by the YWCA in 2002.

Personal life
Fabe is married to Randall Simpson. They have a daughter and at least one grandchild.

She has been an active supporter of arts, civic, and other community organizations, for example, as a trustee of the Anchorage Museum Organization and the Soroptimists.

See also
List of female state supreme court justices

References

|-

|-

|-

|-

|-

1951 births
Living people
Cornell University alumni
Northeastern University School of Law alumni
Women in Alaska politics
American women judges
Justices of the Alaska Supreme Court
Lawyers from Cincinnati
Politicians from Anchorage, Alaska
Seven Hills School (Cincinnati, Ohio) alumni
Women chief justices of state supreme courts in the United States
Lawyers from Anchorage, Alaska
Chief Justices of the Alaska Supreme Court
21st-century American women
20th-century American women judges
20th-century American judges
21st-century women judges
Public defenders